René Assouman Joeffrey is a Rwandan footballer who currently plays for Hillerød IF of the Danish 2nd Division, and the Rwanda national team.

Youth
Joeffrey was born in Rwanda to a DR Congolese father and Rwandan mother. His family moved to Denmark when he was nine years old. He began playing football when he was twelve.

International career
In July 2021 Joeffrey received his first international call-up for Rwanda ahead of the 2021 CECAFA U-23 Challenge Cup. However, Rwanda pulled out of the competition because of the COVID-19 pandemic. He was called up to the senior squad the following December for a pair of friendlies against Guinea in January 2022.  He made his senior international debut on 3 January 2022 in the first match of the series.

International career statistics

References

External links

2002 births
Living people
Rwandan footballers
Rwanda international footballers
Rwandan people of Democratic Republic of the Congo descent
Association football midfielders
Danish 2nd Division players
Boldklubben af 1893 players